Here is a partial list of awards and nominations received by Kristen Wiig throughout her career.

She is known for her work as a cast member on Saturday Night Live and as an actor and co-writer for Bridesmaids (2011). 

She has received an Academy Award for Best Original Screenplay, BAFTA Award for Best Original Screenplay, Golden Globe Award, and Screen Actors Guild Award nominations. She has also received nine Primetime Emmy Award nominations, including four Outstanding Supporting Actress in a Comedy Series nominations and three Outstanding Guest Actress in a Comedy Series.

Major awards

Academy Awards

BAFTA Awards

Critics' Choice Awards

Golden Globe Awards

Primetime Emmy Awards

Guild awards

Screen Actors Guild Awards

Writers Guild of America Awards

Other awards

References

External links
 

Lists of awards received by American actor